"Half a Heart Tattoo" is a song co-written and recorded by American country music artist Jennifer Hanson.  It was released in August 2003 as the third single from the album Jennifer Hanson.  The song reached #40 on the Billboard Hot Country Singles & Tracks chart.  The song was written by Hanson, Michael P. Heeney and A. J. Masters.

Chart performance

References

2003 singles
2003 songs
Songs written by Jennifer Hanson
Songs written by Michael P. Heeney
Songs written by A. J. Masters
Song recordings produced by Greg Droman
Capitol Records Nashville singles